Calycomyza flavinotum is a species of leaf miner fly (family Agromyzidae). It creates whitish blotch-shaped mines on the leaves of Ageratina altissima, Arctium minus (lesser burdock), Eupatorium spp., Eutrochium maculatum (spotted Joe Pye weed), and Eutrochium purpureum (purple Joe Pye weed), all flowering plants in the sunflower family.

References

Agromyzidae
Articles created by Qbugbot
Insects described in 1956